The bearded helmetcrests (Oxypogon) are a genus of hummingbird in the family Trochilidae. They are found in Colombia and Venezuela. Primary natural habitat is subtropical or tropical high-altitude grassland, known as páramo. The genus contains four species.

Taxonomy and species list
The genus Oxypogon was introduced in 1848 by the English ornithologist John Gould. The type species was subsequently designated as the green-bearded helmetcrest. The genus name combines the Ancient Greek oxus meaning "sharp" or "pointed" with pōgōn meaning "beard".

The genus contains four species:
 White-bearded helmetcrest, Oxypogon lindenii 
 Green-bearded helmetcrest, Oxypogon guerinii
 Blue-bearded helmetcrest, Oxypogon cyanolaemus
 Buffy helmetcrest, Oxypogon stuebelii

These four species were formerly all considered as subspecies of what was known as the bearded helmetcrest (Oxypogon guerinii). The bearded helmetcrest was split into four separate species based on a study of biometric and plumage data published in 2013.

A study of mitochondrial DNA of hummingbirds shows it to be most closely related to the bearded mountaineer (Oreonympha nobilis) and the rufous-capped thornbill (Chalcostigma ruficeps). The other member of the genus Chalcostigma lay outside the group, suggesting the genus might need revising in the future.

Description
The most common species, the white-bearded helmetcrest, measures  in length, it is a small hummingbird with a very small  bill. The adult male has a distinctive pointed black crest and a shaggy white beard. The face and cheeks are blackish, rendering a triangular shape with the white fronted crest and white beard. The underparts are a dull green-grey. The female lacks the beard and crest.

Its main habitat is the páramo, but can descend to the treeline outside of breeding season.

All species often perch on boulders and flit between low-flowering shrubs, visiting the flowers of the genera Espeletia, Echeveria, Siphocampylus, Castilleja and Draba.

All species breed during the rainy season, and nest in the daisy Espeletia or build a nest of material from the daisy in a cliff or bank.

References

 
Taxonomy articles created by Polbot